Pat Noonan (born August 2, 1980) is an American soccer coach and former soccer player. He is the head coach of FC Cincinnati in Major League Soccer.

Playing career

College and amateur
Noonan attended De Smet Jesuit High School, and played college soccer for the Indiana University Hoosiers from 1999 to 2002. He was named an NSCAA first-team All-American his senior and junior seasons, and second-team All-American his sophomore year. His senior year, he also finished as runner-up to Alecko Eskandarian for the Hermann Trophy. He finished his career at Indiana with 48 goals and 31 assists. During his college years, Noonan also played with the Mid-Michigan Bucks in the USL Premier Development League

Club

New England Revolution
Upon graduation, Noonan was selected in the first round (9th overall) of the 2003 MLS SuperDraft by New England Revolution. Although he started slowly, Noonan soon resumed his scoring ways, finishing his first season with the Revs with ten goals and seven assists, and runner-up to Damani Ralph for Rookie of the Year. Noonan did even better his sophomore year, scoring eleven goals and registering eight assists, tying with Amado Guevara for the MLS Scoring Champion Award. A late-season slump saw Noonan end 2005 with eight goals and seven assists. Noonan's 2006 campaign was marred by injury and he appeared in only 14 games, netting just one goal. He began in 2007 injured once again and then became a substitute as he regained his fitness.  However, he rounded into form and finished the season with 7 goals. Noonan's option for the 2008 season was not picked up by New England and on January 23, 2008, he signed with Norwegian club Aalesunds FK.

Columbus Crew
On August 6, 2008, Noonan re-signed with MLS and was traded from New England, who still retained his rights, to Columbus Crew in exchange for the Crew's natural first-round selection in the 2009 MLS SuperDraft and allocation money. Additionally, the teams traded spots in the current 2008 allocation standings – with Columbus moving into the 10th spot and New England moving to third – and agreed to considerations regarding 2009 allocation rankings. For Columbus Crew, Noonan won the MLS Supporters' Shield, MLS Cup and Trillium Cup, all of them in 2008.

Colorado Rapids
Noonan was traded to Colorado Rapids in June 2009. After making seventeen league appearances, Noonan was waived by Colorado on March 23, 2010.

Seattle Sounders FC
After a short trial with Seattle Sounders FC, Noonan signed with the club on March 30, 2010. He remained with Seattle through the 2011 season. At season's end, the club declined his 2012 contract option and he entered the 2011 MLS Re-Entry Draft.

LA Galaxy
Noonan was selected by Los Angeles Galaxy in stage two of the draft on December 12, 2011. Eleven days later he signed with Los Angeles.

Noonan remained with Los Angeles through the 2012 season. After the conclusion of the 2012 season, LA declined the 2013 option on Noonan's contract and he entered the 2012 MLS Re-Entry Draft. Noonan became a free agent after he went undrafted in both rounds of the draft. On January 11, 2013, LA announced that Noonan had retired as a player and had joined the club as an assistant coach.

International

Noonan earned his first cap for the United States national team on March 13, 2004, against Haiti. While he has accumulated 15 caps, injuries and inconsistency prevented him from claiming a major role with the national team. However, in early 2008 he started with the U.S. National Team against Sweden and registered an assist in a 2–0 victory. He did not play for the national team after 2008.

International goals

Coaching career

United States National Team
After Noonan's retirement as a player, he joined the Galaxy's technical staff as an assistant coach to Bruce Arena. When Arena was announced as returning to be the head coach of the United States national team, he brought his supporting staff from the Galaxy, including Noonan, to work as assistants.

Philadelphia Union
In January 2018, Noonan was hired as an assistant coach alongside Jim Curtin at the Philadelphia Union.

FC Cincinnati
Noonan was named head coach of FC Cincinnati on December 14, 2021. He led Cincinnati to fifth place in the Eastern Conference as they clinched their first-ever MLS Cup Playoff berth, Noonan's Orange and Blue beat New York Red Bulls on the road 2–1 before falling to the Philadelphia Union, 1–0, in the Eastern Conference Semifinals.

Honors

United States
CONCACAF Gold Cup Champions (1): 2005

Columbus Crew
Major League Soccer Eastern Conference Championship (1): 2008
Major League Soccer MLS Cup (1): 2008
Major League Soccer Supporter's Shield (1): 2008

New England Revolution
Lamar Hunt U.S. Open Cup (1): 2007
Major League Soccer Eastern Conference Championship (3): 2005, 2006, 2007

Seattle Sounders FC
Lamar Hunt U.S. Open Cup (2): 2010, 2011

Los Angeles Galaxy
Major League Soccer Western Conference Championship (1): 2012
Major League Soccer MLS Cup (1): 2012

References

External links

1980 births
Living people
2005 CONCACAF Gold Cup players
Aalesunds FK players
All-American men's college soccer players
American expatriate soccer players
American soccer players
Major League Soccer coaches
Association football forwards
Colorado Rapids players
Columbus Crew players
CONCACAF Gold Cup-winning players
Eliteserien players
Expatriate footballers in Norway
Indiana Hoosiers men's soccer players
LA Galaxy non-playing staff
LA Galaxy players
Major League Soccer All-Stars
Major League Soccer players
Flint City Bucks players
New England Revolution draft picks
New England Revolution players
People from Ballwin, Missouri
Philadelphia Union non-playing staff
FC Cincinnati coaches
FC Cincinnati non-playing staff
Seattle Sounders FC players
Soccer players from Missouri
Sportspeople from St. Louis County, Missouri
United States men's international soccer players
USL League Two players